Cambeck Bridge is a hamlet in Cumbria, England.

The bridge itself was built in the 19th century and spans the River Irthing. It is a Grade II listed building, listed in 1984.

References

Hamlets in Cumbria
Bridges in Cumbria
Grade II listed bridges
Grade II listed buildings in Cumbria